Claes Ivarsson (1968–2017) was an international speedway rider from Sweden.

Speedway career 
Ivarsson won a bronze medal at the Swedish Individual Speedway Championship in 1992. He rode for Elit Vetlanda Speedway for 20 years, scoring 2,390 points.

Family
His brother Conny Ivarsson was also an international speedway rider.

References 

1968 births
2017 deaths
Swedish speedway riders